This is a list of wars involving the Republic of Sierra Leone.

References

 
Sierra Leone
Wars